Soma Gas & Oil is a private oil company founded chiefly to explore natural resources in Somalia in 2013. Its registered office is in London, United Kingdom. The company is backed by Russian billionaire Alexander Djaparidze.

Overview
In 2013, it signed an oil contract with the Federal Government of Somalia, becoming the first international company to do so. In exchange for collecting data, Soma Oil & Gas has the right to apply for up to twelve oil blocks in an area seen by oil majors as one of the final frontiers for the commodity. The company, which has not undertaken a seismic survey before, was incorporated in the UK with capital of £0.001. To date, the company has invested approximately US$40 million on the Exploration Programme, more than double the required spend under the terms of the Seismic Option Agreement.

Seismic programme
In April 2015, the company announced it had completed the processing and reprocessing of the acquired 2D seismic data. The seismic acquisition programme was carried out by SeaBird Exploration and concluded in June 2014 with over 20,500 km lines of 2D seismic data having been acquired across a 114,000 sq km offshore evaluation area.

Production sharing agreement
In May 2015, the company proposed a deal that could grant it up to 90% of Somalia's oil revenue. If output exceeds  , Somalia’s take rises to 30%. According to Soma Oil & Gas the proposals being discussed are in line with industry standards.

Serious Frauds Office investigation
In August 2015, Soma Oil and Gas was investigated by the Serious Fraud Office. A UN report had accused Soma of "appearing to fund systematic payoffs to senior ministerial officials." Soma Oil and Gas denied any wrongdoing and its chair, Lord Howard, was not personally implicated in the accusations. On 14 December 2016, The Serious Fraud Office closed its investigation of Soma, citing insufficient evidence of corruption.

References

Oil and gas companies of the United Kingdom
Oil exploration
Petroleum in Somalia